Sesostris Bank is a submerged bank or sunken atoll belonging to the Amindivi Subgroup of islands of the Union Territory of Lakshadweep, India, and has a distance of  south of the city of Delhi.

Geography
It is also one of the northernmost features, after Cora Divh and Bassas de Pedro. Those coral banks, all submerged, form the north of Lakshadweep. Sesostris Bank is about 22 km in diameter.
There are no emergent cays or islands. Depths range from 20 to 77 meters. Depths near the bank reach 700 meters.

This bank was named after the steam frigate  of the Indian Navy.

Administration
The bank belongs to the township of Chetlat Island of Aminidivi Tehsil.

References

External links

Prostar Sailing Directions 2005 India & Bay of Bengal

Undersea banks of Lakshadweep
Reefs of the Indian Ocean
Reefs of India
Underwater diving sites in India